Farwell House or Farwell Site may refer to:

in the United States
(by state)
Farwell Barn, Mansfield, Connecticut, on University of Connecticut campus, also site of former Farwell House, now an archeological site
S.S. Farwell House, Monticello, Iowa, NRHP-listed, listed on the NRHP in Jones County, Iowa
R.H. Farwell House, Cambridge, Massachusetts, NRHP-listed
Farwell Archeological District, DuBois, Nebraska, listed on the NRHP in Pawnee County, Nebraska
Corban C. Farwell Homestead, Harrisville, New Hampshire, listed on the NRHP in Cheshire County, New Hampshire
Farwell's Point Mound Group, Madison, Wisconsin, listed on the NRHP in Dane County, Wisconsin

See also
Farwell Building, Detroit, Michigan
Farwell Mill, Lisbon, Maine
Farwell School, Charlestown, New Hampshire, listed on the NRHP in Sullivan County, New Hampshire